Robert Michael Dirk (born August 20, 1966) is a Canadian former professional ice hockey player. Dirk played in the National Hockey League between 1987 and 1996.

Playing career
Dirk was born in Regina, Saskatchewan. He was selected 54th overall in the 1984 NHL Entry Draft by the St. Louis Blues. He would turn pro in 1986 and spend the next five seasons bouncing between the NHL club and the Peoria Rivermen, the Blues IHL affiliate. He would finally stick on the Blues roster full-time in 1990–91, appearing in 41 games before being moved to the Vancouver Canucks in a 6-player deal at the trade deadline.

Dirk would find a home on an up-and-coming Vancouver team. While his skating and skill level were limited, he was a big, bruising defensive defender well thought of for his heart and grit. He appeared in a career-high 72 games in 1991–92, recording 2 goals and 9 points along with 126 penalty minutes. In 1992–93, he set career bests with 12 points and 150 penalty minutes in 69 games. He spent his third full season with the Canucks in 1993–94, but the acquisition of Jeff Brown and Bret Hedican in a deal with St. Louis left Vancouver with too many bodies on defence, and he was dispatched to the Chicago Blackhawks for a draft pick at the trade deadline.

After only 6 games for Chicago, Dirk was moved again, this time to the Mighty Ducks of Anaheim, for the 1994–95 campaign. After a season and a half with the Ducks, he was dealt to the Montreal Canadiens in 1996. However, he would fracture his shoulder in his debut for Montreal and was never able to establish himself, appearing in only 3 games for the team.

Released by the Habs following the 1995–96 season, Dirk spent a year in the IHL before retiring and moving into coaching. He finished his career with 13 goals and 29 assists for 42 points in 402 career games, along with 786 penalty minutes.

Coaching career
On his retirement as a player in 1997, Dirk accepted a head coaching job in the UHL with the Winston-Salem Icehawks. He would spend three seasons in the UHL, one in Winston-Salem before joining the Saginaw Gears for two more years. He spent the 2000–2002 seasons with the WCHL Tacoma Sabercats, before being hired as the first head coach of the Texas Wildcatters of the ECHL.

Following his release from the Wildcatters in 2005, Dirk remained in Beaumont, Texas to take a job as the director of the Montagne Center, the home venue of the athletic squads for Lamar University. He then traveled to and from Houston, Texas to coach his son's bantam AA team. He was the coach for the Penticton Lakers Junior B team in the KIJHL, but has now moved on to coach various teams at the Okanagan Hockey Academy for players 14-18.

Career statistics

Awards
 WHL East Second All-Star Team – 1986

External links
 

1966 births
Living people
Canadian ice hockey defencemen
Chicago Blackhawks players
Chicago Wolves (IHL) players
Detroit Vipers players
Ice hockey people from Saskatchewan
Kelowna Buckaroos players
Mighty Ducks of Anaheim players
Montreal Canadiens players
St. Louis Blues draft picks
St. Louis Blues players
Sportspeople from Regina, Saskatchewan
Vancouver Canucks players